State Route 174 (SR 174) is a  long state highway that traverses Douglas, Grant and Lincoln counties in Washington.

Prior to the establishment of SR 174 in a 1964 renumbering, it had been county roads and two highways, Secondary State Highway 10B (SSH 10B) and Secondary State Highway 4C (SSH 4C) from 1937 until 1964. The two highways merged to form SR 174 in 1964 and a branch of SSH 10B became the Crown Point spur of SR 174. A second spur route, located in Leahy, was added in 2009.

Route description

The western terminus is only accessible from SR 17 southbound, access from SR 17 northbound is provided by the Leahy spur of SR 174. From Leahy, the highway travels northeastward through grasslands with few farms before turning southeast to intersect its Crown Point spur near the Grand Coulee Dam. The roadway then enters Grant County and the city of Grand Coulee and becomes the Bridgeport Highway. SR 174 continues to the Grand Coulee Dam federal reservation and state maintenance ends through the area. After the intersection, the highway is named Grand Coulee Avenue and passes Grand Coulee Middle School and Skilskin High School before leaving the city and the county.

History

SR 174 had previously been parts of various county roads until 1937, when Washington established a system of primary and secondary highways throughout the state. It was planned in conjunction with the dam project in the late 1930s and began construction in 1939. Another secondary highway, Secondary State Highway 4C (SSH 4C) ran from Grand Coulee to  near Wilbur. A branch of SSH 10B from its main route to the Crown Point viewing area of the Grand Coulee Dam was added in 1955. SR 174 was formed after a 1964 renumbering of Washington state highways, eliminating the previous Primary and secondary highway system. SSH 10B and SSH 4C were connected to become the new highway and the renumbering went into effect in 1970. In 2009, a second spur
in Leahy was established and added to the state highway system.

Major intersections

Spur routes
State Route 174 (SR 174) has two spur routes, a type of special route.

Leahy spur

The roadway is named Leahy Road and serves as a connector from northbound  to SR 174.

Crown Point spur

The older spur route is located near the Grand Coulee Dam and connects SR 174 to Crown Point State Park, part of the Lake Roosevelt National Recreation Area, within the community of Coulee Dam. The Crown Point Spur was a spur route of SSH 10B, established in 1955, prior to 1964. The roadway itself is within federal property and is not numbered or maintained by the state.

References

External links

Highways of Washington State

174
Transportation in Douglas County, Washington
Transportation in Grant County, Washington
Transportation in Lincoln County, Washington